See You Tomorrow, Everyone, in Japanese  is a 2013 Japanese film directed by Yoshihiro Nakamura starring Gaku Hamada. It was released in Japan on January 26, 2013 and in the USA at the Hawaii International Film Festival on October 12, 2013.

Plot
Starting in 1981, the film follows the life of Satoru Watarai (Hamada) from 12 to 30 years old.  After dropping out of Junior High School,  Watarai has resolved never to set foot outside his danchi (Japanese apartment complex).  As he watches his classmates gradually move away, he begins a daily routine of exercise, martial arts and security patrols which he believes will protect the danchi and preserve its way of life.  The film also explores Watarai's struggle to build relationships, make a living and deal with the dilapidation of the complex in the wake of the collapse of Japan's bubble economy.

Cast
 Gaku Hamada as Satoru Watarai
 Kana Kurashina as Saki Ogata
 Kento Nagayama as Noriaki Sonoda
 Haru as Yuri Nagashima
 Nene Otsuka as Hina Watarai

Reception
In a review for the website efilmcritic.com, Jay Seaver praises Hamada's ability to reflect the character's development from a Junior High School student to a 30-year-old man.  This was done without the use of make-up effects.

References

External links
 

2013 films
2010s Japanese-language films
2010s Japanese films
Films directed by Yoshihiro Nakamura
Japanese drama films